Doddarangegowda is a Kannada poet and a lyricist working for Kannada cinema. He is a retired professor of Kannada and has published a number of anthologies in Kannada. He has released several audio cassettes and CDs of his poems. Some of his noteworthy songs are Tera Yeri Ambaradaage and Notadaage Nageya Meeti of Parasangada Gendethimma, Nammoora Mandara Hoove of Aalemane, Sri Rama Bandavne of Paduvaaralli Pandavaru. He was also a Bharatiya Janata Party MLC. In 2018, he was awarded with the civilian award Padma Shri.

Early life 
Doddarangegowda was born on 7 February 1946 to K. Rangegowda and Akkamma.His wife Rajeshwari Gowda a kannada Professor.

Career
Doddarangegowda worked as a professor of Kannada in SLN College of Arts, Science & Commerce, Bengaluru and later served as Principal. He has penned more than 500 Kannada cinema songs with many achieving critical acclaim and awards. He has written dialogues for more than 10 films and has scripted over 100 tele-serials.

Selected works
Doddarangegowda has written lyrics, odes, travelogues, and some other prose works.

Anthologies 
 Maavu Bevu (Collection of songs)
 Kannu Naalage Kadalu

Lyricist 
Doddarangegowda has written lyrics for the following Kannada cinemas.
 Parasangada Gendethimma
 Janumada Jodi - Kolumande Jangama, Janumada Jodi Neenu, Aarathi Annammange
 Aalemane
 Paduvaaralli Pandavaru
 Ganeshana Maduve
 Aruna Raaga
 Kavya
 Megha Mandara
 Belli Kalungura - Kelisade Kallu kallinali
 Spandana
 Sri Kshetra Adi Chunchanagiri 
 Thandege Thakka Maga -Namma Oora Deepa

Awards and nominations 
 1972: Karnataka Sahitya Akademi Award for Poetry — Kannu Naalage Kadalu
 1991: Karnataka State Film Award for Best Lyricist — Ganeshana Maduve
 1996: Karnataka State Film Award for Best Lyricist — Kavya
 1997: Karnataka State Film Award for Best Lyricist — Janumada Jodi
 2003: Attimabbe award
 2018: Padmashree award

References

Living people
Kannada-language lyricists
Kannada-language writers
Kannada poets
Recipients of the Padma Shri in arts
1946 births